The Very Best of Randy Crawford is a compilation album by American singer Randy Crawford, released in 1993. It features singles and album tracks from Crawford's studio albums Everything Must Change (1976), Raw Silk (1979), Now We May Begin (1980), Secret Combination (1981), Windsong (1982), Nightline (1983), Abstract Emotions (1986), Rich and Poor (1989) and Through the Eyes of Love (1992), plus one track from the live album Casino Lights (1982).

The Very Best of Randy Crawford reached number 8 in the UK Albums Chart.

Track listing

Charts and certifications

Weekly charts

Certifications

References

External links
The Very Best of Randy Crawford at Discogs

1993 compilation albums
Warner Records compilation albums
Randy Crawford albums